Zhang Gong may refer to:

 Zhang Gong (footballer) (born 1992), Chinese footballer
 Zhang Gong (general) (born 1935), officer in the People's Liberation Army of China
 Zhang Gong (politician) (born 1961), Chinese politician and the current mayor of Tianjin